The 1994 North Texas Mean Green football team was an American football team that represented the University of North Texas during the 1994 NCAA Division I-AA football season as a member of the Southland Conference. In their first year under head coach Matt Simon, the team compiled a 7–4–1 record and finished as Southland champion.

Schedule

References

North Texas
North Texas Mean Green football seasons
Southland Conference football champion seasons
North Texas Mean Green football